The Sodality Chapel is a historic Roman Catholic chapel building on the campus of Spring Hill College in Mobile, Alabama, United States.  It was built in 1850 in a simple Greek Revival style. The building was placed on the National Register of Historic Places as a part of the 19th Century Spring Hill Neighborhood Thematic Resource on October 18, 1984.

See also
Spring Hill College

References

Roman Catholic churches completed in 1850
National Register of Historic Places in Mobile, Alabama
Properties of religious function on the National Register of Historic Places in Alabama
Roman Catholic churches in Mobile, Alabama
Roman Catholic Archdiocese of Mobile
Roman Catholic churches in Alabama
University and college chapels in the United States
Spring Hill College
Greek Revival church buildings in Alabama
University and college buildings on the National Register of Historic Places in Alabama
Roman Catholic chapels in the United States
University and college buildings completed in 1850
1850 establishments in Alabama
19th-century Roman Catholic church buildings in the United States